Tetra-amelia syndrome (tetra- + amelia), also called autosomal recessive tetraamelia, is an extremely rare autosomal recessive congenital disorder characterized by the absence of all four limbs. Other areas of the body are also affected by malformations, such as the face, skull, reproductive organs, anus, lungs and pelvis. The disorder can be caused by recessive mutations in the WNT3 or RSPO2 genes.

Presentation
Tetra-amelia syndrome is characterized by the complete absence of all four limbs. The syndrome causes severe malformations of various parts of the body, including the face and head, heart, nervous system, skeleton, and genitalia. In many cases, the lungs are underdeveloped, which makes breathing difficult or impossible. Because children with tetra-amelia syndrome have such serious medical problems, most are stillborn or die shortly after birth.

Cause

RSPO2 and WNT3  genes
Researchers have found loss-of-function mutations in the WNT3 or the RSPO2 genes in people with tetra-amelia syndrome from several consanguineous families. These two gene encode proteins belonging to the WNT pathway which plays critical roles during development.

The protein produced from the WNT3 and RSPO2 genes are involved in the formation of the limbs and other body systems during embryonic development. Mutations in the WNT3 or RSPO2 genes prevent cells from producing functional WNT3 and RSPO2 proteins, which disrupts normal limb formation and leads to the other serious birth defects associated with tetra-amelia syndrome.

According to a 2018 study by Bruno Reversade, the loss of RSPO2, unlike WNT3, also prevents formation of the lungs causing a lethal syndrome of tetra-amelia.

Inheritance within families
In most of the families reported so far, tetra-amelia syndrome appears to have an autosomal recessive pattern of inheritance. This means the defective gene responsible for the disorder is located on an autosome , and two copies of the defective gene (one inherited from each parent) are required in order to be born with the disorder. The parents of an individual with an autosomal recessive disorder both carry one copy of the defective gene, but usually do not experience any signs or symptoms of the disorder.

Epidemiology
Tetra-amelia syndrome has been reported in only a few families worldwide.
According to a 2011 study by Bermejo-Sanchez, amelia – that is, the lacking of one or more limbs – occurs in roughly 1 out of every 71,000 pregnancies.

People with tetra-amelia syndrome

 Joanne O'Riordan of Millstreet, Cork, Ireland. At the age of 16 she addressed the United Nations in New York. She appeared before the International Telecommunication Union’s conference ‘Girls in Technology’, receiving a standing ovation after delivering the keynote speech.
 Hirotada Ototake
 Lisa Manyata Olson, b. 1974 India. Founder of Manyata Ministries, seeking to share God's message of love and acceptance. 
 Nick Vujicic, founder of Life Without Limbs.
 Prince Randian
 Violetta (entertainer)
 Kent Bell (1965-2015) of Jacksonville, FL, scoreboard operator and disabled rights advocate, appeared on Oprah Winfrey show and in numerous print articles over the course of his life.
 Rob Mendez, varsity football team offensive coordinator at Francis Parker School (San Diego).
 Christian Arndt of Germany, media presenter.

References

External links 

 

Congenital disorders
Autosomal recessive disorders
Syndromes
Rare diseases
Extracellular ligand disorders
Congenital amputations